En Thamizh En Makkal is a 1988 Indian Tamil-language political drama film directed by Santhana Bharathi. The film stars Sivaji Ganesan, Vadivukkarasi, Nizhalgal Ravi Chinni Jayanth and Major Sundarrajan. It was released on 2 September 1988.

Cast 
Sivaji Ganesan
Vadivukkarasi
Nizhalgal Ravi
Pallavi
Chinni Jayanth
Major Sundarrajan
S. S. Chandran
Pandu
Vijayakumar
V. K. Ramasamy

Soundtrack 
Soundtrack was composed by Gangai Amaran.
"Aarambichu" – Malaysia Vasudevan, K. S. Chithra
"Vaangiya Sudhanthiram" – Malaysia Vasudevan
"Papparappa" – Vani Jairam
"Kurinji Malar" – Malaysia Vasudevan

Reception 
The Indian Express wrote, "[sic] care has been taken to see that narrative does not lose its dramatic interest and go against the narrative grain of Tamil cinema".

References

External links 
 

1980s political drama films
1980s Tamil-language films
1988 drama films
1988 films
Films directed by Santhana Bharathi
Films scored by Gangai Amaran
Indian political drama films